The Mad Bomberg (German: Der tolle Bomberg) is a 1923 novel by the German writer Josef Winckler. It is loosely based on the legendary exploits of a real-life aristocrat Gisbert von Romberg (1839-1897). The novel has been adapted into films on two occasions. The first was a 1932 film The Mad Bomberg directed by Georg Asagaroff. The second The Mad Bomberg (1957) was a vehicle for the actor Hans Albers, which attempted to recreate the success of his 1943 film Münchhausen.

References

Bibliography 
 Hake, Sabine. Popular Cinema of the Third Reich. University of Texas Press, 2001.

1923 German novels
1923 German-language novels
Historical novels
Novels set in the 19th century
Novels set in Germany
Novels by Josef Winckler
German novels adapted into films